A nut roast or roasted nut loaf is a vegetarian dish consisting of nuts, grains, vegetable oils, broth or butter, and seasonings formed into a firm loaf shape or long casserole dish before roasting and often eaten as an alternative to a traditional British style roast dinner. It is popular with vegetarians at Christmas, as well as part of a traditional Sunday roast. Nut roasts are also made by Canadian and American vegetarians and vegans as the main dish for Thanksgiving or other harvest festival meals.

Ingredients
Nut roasts are commonly made with any single type or complementary combination of nuts and legumes desired such as walnuts, hazelnuts, Brazil nuts, pecans, cashew nuts, pistachios, chestnuts, sunflower seeds and peanuts and even lentils. The nuts may be whole, chopped up, or ground and are typically combined with one or several starches such as breadcrumbs or day-old bread, cooked rice, buckwheat kasha, groats, barley, rye or millet. The nuts and the starches are bound together with aromatics such as onions, garlic, or leeks, with fresh vegetable broth or bouillon cubes used and olive oil or butter. Seasoning is provided by complementary herbs of the cook's choosing. Sautéed mushrooms or truffle shavings or flavored oil, or tomatoes or cheese may be added for extra flavour and variety of texture. Vegemite, Marmite, or soy sauce is sometimes used as one of the stocks or what the onions are fried in. Some recipes call for a chicken's egg to bind the ingredients together.

The whole mixture is roasted or baked in a loaf pan or other baking dish until firm or a crust forms, and then served with side dishes. Whole nuts may be used as a garnish or decoration for the completed roast.

Instant varieties are also available in the UK, Ireland, and other countries, where only added water is needed before baking in an oven.

See also
 Groaty pudding
 Hotdish, a type of casserole from the American Midwest
 List of casserole dishes
 List of meat substitutes
 List of winter festivals
 Scrapple, leftovers with cornmeal and buckwheat formed into a loaf
 Stuffed pepper, a dish of deseeded peppers stuffed with savory mixtures and baked
 Tofurkey, loaves or casseroles made typically with soy or wheat protein
 Nuteena was a canned nut roast type product
 White pudding

References

External links

 Another Nut Roast recipe
 Article about Nut roasts and a collection of Nut roast recipes.
 Vegetarian Nut Roast with mushrooms and basil Recipe
Meat substitutes
Christmas food
Vegetarian cuisine
Vegan cuisine
Casserole dishes
Nut dishes